Chilaun was a general in the Mongol Empire, known as one of Genghis Khan's four valiant warriors. His relatives, specifically his father Sorqan-Shira, helped young Genghis escape from captivity at the hands of the Tayichiuds. His descendants include Chupan. 

His name "Chuluun" means "rock/rocky" in the Mongolian language.

Descendants 
Sorqan Šira（鎖兒罕失剌/suŏérhǎnshīlà,سورغان شيره/Sūrghān Shīra）
Čila'un ba'atur（赤老溫/chìlǎowēn, چيلاوغان بهادر/Chīlāūghān bahādur）
（宿敦/sùdūn, سدون نویان/Sudūn Nūyān）
Qajudar（قاجودر/Qājūdar）
Sartaq noyan（سرتاق نویان/Sartāq Nūyān）
Burja（بورجه/Būrja）
Sunjaq noyan（سونجاق نویان/Sūnjāq Nūyān）
Tudan（تودان/Tūdān）
Malik（ملك/Malik）
Čuban（جوبان/Jūbān）
（阿剌罕/ālàhǎn）
Soγudu（鎖兀都/suŏwùdōu）
Tangγutai（唐古䚟/tánggŭdǎi）
（健都班/jiàndōubān）
Nadr（納図兒/nàtúér）
（察剌/chálà）
Uquna（忽訥/hūnè）
（脫帖穆耳/tuōtièmùěr）
（月魯不花/yuèlǔbùhuā）
（沈伯/shĕnbǎi）

See also
 Chupanids

References
The Secret History of the Mongols

Military history of the Mongol Empire
Generals of the Mongol Empire